The Fresno State–Hawaii football rivalry is an American college football rivalry between the Fresno State Bulldogs and the Hawaii Rainbow Warriors. Also nicknamed the Battle for the Golden Screwdriver, it is Hawaii's most-played rivalry series. The two teams have met 55 times, with Fresno State leading the all-time series 30–24–1 through the 2022 season.

Game results

Overview
Fresno State and Hawaii first met in 1938 on the basis of the Pineapple Bowl (then not an NCAA-sanctioned bowl) being in Honolulu that year. Fresno was invited back for the 1941 Pineapple Bowl, which the Bulldogs won, 3–0. The rivalry went mostly unnoticed as Fresno State and Hawaii alternated winning streaks. It wasn't until 1992 under coach Bob Wagner that the rivalry took center stage as Fresno joined the Western Athletic Conference (WAC) in 1992 after the Bulldogs departed the Big West. However, much of the games went without bravado, with each team winning from anywhere from five to 20 points.

In 1999, Hawaii head coach June Jones and Fresno State head coach Pat Hill first faced each other at Aloha Stadium. That matchup featured Dan Robinson and Billy Volek, a future NFL star. Hawaii took the 13–7 halftime lead, but Fresno State tied the game at 21, sending it to overtime. Trailing 24–21, Eric Hannum, who missed a 29-yard field goal and an extra point, made a chip shot field goal to send the game to a second overtime. Robinson connected with Craig Stutzmann, giving Hawaii a 31–24 lead. The Rainbows (as UH was known back then) then used one last stand to take over first place in the WAC and secured a berth in the 1999 Oahu Bowl.

In a 2002 interview with The Honolulu Advertiser, Hill stated: "Hawai'i is a great game, but I don't know [if] you can call it a rivalry. I don't know what the biggest rivalry is. I don't know if there are any rivalries in this conference [the WAC] yet." Honolulu Star-Advertiser sports writer Ferd Lewis commented in 2010 that Fresno State was among "at best, merely flickering rivalries" for Hawaii against mainland teams. Yet Lewis has also described the series as having "a knock-down, drag-out history and an attitude." By 2014, both teams were in the Mountain West Conference and Hawaii struggled in conference play, in contrast to Fresno State winning the Mountain West Championship Game and contending for another appearance.

Screwdriver incident
There have been various urban legends surrounding the two programs, among the most notable about a screwdriver being thrown towards June Jones after Hawaii's October 25, 2002 victory over Fresno State. Although Jones claimed that he saw a screwdriver being thrown over his head from the Fresno State student section and falling on the field, a Fresno State investigation did not produce any witnesses from security or field crews. On October 31, 2002, Fresno State athletic director Scott Johnson issued an apology to Hawaii fans that stated in part: "...we believe that a screwdriver was thrown by one of our fans at the University of Hawai'i team bench."

That alleged incident inspired a "Golden Screwdriver" trophy being entered into a contest held by Fresno radio station KFIG "ESPN 940" to create a symbol of the Fresno State/Hawaii rivalry. Former Hawaii head coach Nick Rolovich expressed approval of such a trophy in 2016.

The fans
Both teams have notoriously committed violence or close to it in recent years, especially after the 1999 game. Fresno State has a tradition called the Red Mile, in which the visiting team must walk outside the locker room to a chorus of jeers and verbal abuse. It has been noted that the NCAA has repeatedly called for Fresno State to stop this tradition due to allegations of violence and racial slurs, which the administration has continually denied. During Hawaii road games, the Red Mile is more full than usual, and many Hawaii players have claimed the fans, which are mostly students, instigated violence in the past.

Hawaii fans have also been implicated as well; Fresno State and Hawaii fan fights are also present at Aloha Stadium, especially pre-game and post-game. Fresno State fans who walk by Hawaii tailgaters often don't make it into the stadium without getting into a fight. In fact, a 2007 report by KITV said that Hawaii fans had committed acts of abuse toward Fresno State fans, which UH Athletics has continually denied to this day. Fresno fans also told Boise State fans, Hawaii's next opponent in 2007, to not attend the game. Allegations ended up being false as Honolulu Advertiser photographers caught pictures of Boise State and Hawaii fans mingling and sharing food before the game.

Former Hawaii linebacker Solomon Elimimian, following the 2008 upset of Fresno State, claimed that 12-year old Fresno State fans were shouting curse words and racial slurs at players, which was vehemently denied by Fresno media and Fresno State's athletics department.

Notable games
1992: Hawaii and Fresno State meet for the first time as members of the Western Athletic Conference following the addition of the Bulldogs for 1992. Hawaii was victorious, 47–45.

1999: In one of the more memorable chapters of the rivalry, Hawaii defeated Fresno State, 31–24, in double overtime. This game propelled Hawaii to a share of the WAC title and gave UH a berth in the 1999 Oahu Bowl. The win followed a 51–12 loss the year before in Fresno.

2001: In the first of six meetings between the two schools in which one of the teams is ranked, future NFL number one draft pick David Carr committed two costly turnovers, leading to 14 Warrior points. Fresno State blew a 27–16 fourth quarter lead, which began with Hawaii quarterback and future head coach Nick Rolovich throwing a 22-yard touchdown pass to Channon Harris with an ensuing two-point conversion by Thero Mitchell. Carr then fumbled a snap on the Hawaii 3-yard line, which led to an 8-play, 96-yard drive in which Hawaii took the lead on Ashley Lelie's second touchdown of the night. Carr then sealed the #18 Bulldogs' fate with a fumble caused by Nate Jackson, leading to the winning Lelie score with thirteen seconds left in a 38–34 upset. Fresno State went on to finish in third place, while Hawaii finished runner-up in the WAC.

2008: Hawaii opened the season 1–3 in the post-Colt Brennan era and then traveled to Fresno, ranked #22 at the time, as the clear underdog. Hawaii blew a 26–9 lead and then eventually were tied 29–29 in the fourth quarter. But the Warriors blocked a late field goal, forcing the second overtime game in the series. Fresno State kicker Kevin Goessling missed a 40-yard field goal on the opening possession, but got a second chance thanks to a running into the kicker penalty. Goessling then missed the ensuing kick and  Hawaii kicker Dan Kelly made his attempt upsetting Fresno State 32–29. It was the second time Hawaii upset a ranked Fresno State, and the first ever win versus a ranked opponent on the road.

2021: In an eerily similar storyline to the 2001 game, Fresno State blew a 24–10 lead after Jake Haener committed two turnovers in the final three possessions, leading to 17 unanswered Hawaii points. It also featured freshman quarterback Brayden Schager throwing two touchdown passes, one to tight end Caeleb Phillips, the other to Calvin Turner, to tie the game with 7:05 remaining. Haener was then strip-sacked by Khoury Bethley, leading to the eventual game-winning field goal by Matthew Shipley. Georgia transfer Hugh Nelson then sealed the Bulldogs' fate with an interception inside the five-yard line, propelling Hawaii to a 27–24 upset, marking the third time the Rainbow Warriors had beaten a ranked Fresno State team.

See also  
 List of NCAA college football rivalry games

References

College football rivalries in the United States
Fresno State Bulldogs football
Hawaii Rainbow Warriors football